Cabin fever is the distressing claustrophobic irritability or restlessness experienced when a person, or group, is stuck at an isolated location or in confined quarters for an extended time. A person may be referred to as stir-crazy, derived from the use of stir meaning "prison".

A person may experience cabin fever in a situation such as being isolated within a vacation cottage out in the countryside, spending long periods underwater in a submarine, or being otherwise isolated from civilization, for instance during a stay-at-home order or under martial law. During cabin fever, a person may experience sleepiness or sleeplessness, have a distrust of anyone they are with, or have an urge to go outside even in adverse conditions such as poor weather or limited visibility. The concept is also invoked humorously to indicate simple boredom from being home alone for an extended period of time.

Cabin fever is not itself a disease and there is no diagnosis. However, related symptoms can lead the sufferer to make irrational decisions that could potentially threaten their life or the life of the group with whom they are confined. Some examples would be suicide or paranoia, or leaving the safety of a cabin during a terrible snow storm that one may be stuck in.

Therapy

One therapy for cabin fever is as simple as getting out and interacting with nature directly. Research has demonstrated that even brief interactions with nature can promote improved cognitive functioning, support a positive mood, and overall well-being. Escaping the confinement of the indoors and changing one's scenery and surroundings can easily help an individual experiencing cabin fever improve their mental state. Going outside to experience the openness of the world will stimulate the brain and body enough to eliminate feelings of intense claustrophobia, paranoia, and restlessness associated with cabin fever.

There is little evidence of those suffering from cabin fever seeing therapists or counselors for treatment; most sufferers simply discuss their symptoms with family or friends as a way of coping with feelings of loneliness and boredom. However, there are cases of "cabin fever" that are diagnosed as mid-winter depression, or seasonal affective disorder (SAD).

In popular culture
The concept of cabin fever was used as a theme in Fyodor Dostoevsky's 1866 novel Crime and Punishment, Chaplin's 1925 film The Gold Rush, Stefan Zweig's 1948 novella The Royal Game, the 1980 horror film The Shining and The Simpsons episode "Mountain of Madness." In the 1996 film Muppet Treasure Island the crew of the Hispaniola sing a production number about succumbing to cabin fever.  The 2019 psychological horror film The Lighthouse depicts the story of two lighthouse keepers who start to lose their sanity when a storm strands them on the remote island where they are stationed. The television show Mythbusters had Adam and Jamie simulate a cabin fever scenario. The hosts concluded that the myth of cabin fever was plausible since the hosts did develop some psychological symptoms commonly associated with cabin fever.

See also

 
 
 
 
 
 Kayak angst

References

Metaphors
English-language idioms
Popular psychology
Adjustment disorders